Resor may refer to:

People:
Helen Lansdowne Resor (1886–1964), American advertising executive with J. Walter Thompson Co.
Helen Resor (ice hockey) (born 1985), American ice hockey player
Pam Resor (born 1940), the Massachusetts State Senator for the Middlesex & Worcester District from 1999 to 2008
Stanley B. Resor (1879–1962), led the J. Walter Thompson (JWT) advertising firm in the mid-twentieth century
Stanley Rogers Resor (1917–2012), American lawyer, United States military officer, and government official

Places:
Resor Island, one of the many uninhabited Canadian arctic islands in Qikiqtaaluk Region, Nunavut

Ships:
R.P. Resor (ship), tanker ship built on speculation in 1936 by the Federal Shipbuilding and Drydock Company of Kearny, New Jersey

See also
William Resor House, historic residence on Greendale Avenue in Cincinnati, Ohio, United States
Reesor (disambiguation)
Reso (disambiguation)
Restore (disambiguation)
Trésor (disambiguation)